Papercrete is a building material that consists of re-pulped paper fiber with Portland cement or clay and/or other soil added. First patented in 1928, it was revived during the 1980s. Although perceived as an environmentally friendly material due to the significant recycled content, this is offset by the presence of cement. The material lacks standardisation, and proper use therefore requires care and experience. Eric Patterson and Mike McCain, who have been credited with independently "inventing" papercrete (they called it "padobe" and "fibrous cement"), have both contributed considerably to research into machinery to make it and ways of using it for building.

Manufacture
The paper to be used can come from a variety of sources, including newspaper, junk mail, magazines, books. A mixer is used to pulp the mix. Depending on the type of mixer, the paper may be soaked in water beforehand.

Standardization and commercial acceptance
As of 2007, papercrete lacks approval from the International Code Council. This limits its range of use within the city limits of most incorporated United States cities where building codes apply. It is not used as a load-bearing wall where building codes apply. However, its strength in model structures has been proven, and homes and small commercial buildings are being constructed. There is little or no evidence of its long-term durability.

In these small building projects, papercrete is being used as an in-fill wall in conjunction with structural steel beams or other load-bearing elements.

Papercrete gets its name from the fact that most formulas use a mixture of water and cement with cellulose fiber. The fiber is usually acquired from recycled newspaper, lottery tickets and phone books. The mixture has the appearance and texture of oatmeal and is poured into forms and dried in the sun, much like the process for making adobe.

Dried papercrete has very low strength, but fails by slow compression (due to the large air content and hence compressibility) rather than in a brittle manner. Concrete and wood (though dry soft wood can be as high as R-2 per inch, high moisture content reduces this value markedly) are not known for their insulating qualities; however, papercrete also provides good insulation.

Unlike concrete or adobe, papercrete blocks are lightweight, less than a third of the weight of a comparably-sized adobe brick. Papercrete is mold resistant and has utility as a sound-proofing material.

Research tests into papercrete were carried out by Barry Fuller in Arizona and Zach Rabon in Texas. Fuller directs government-funded research on papercrete through the Arizona State University Ira A. Fulton School of Engineering. He is also head of a subcommittee for the American Society for Testing and Materials, and it is his goal to set standards that will lead to acceptance of the product within the architectural community and commercialization of the product, especially for affordable housing.

Structural tests have been completed on several papercrete formulas and Fuller claims the compressive strength of papercrete to be in the  range, while others like Kelly Hart claim .  For comparison, the compressive strength of concrete ranges from  depending on the application. A more useful measure of papercrete's properties is its stiffness, that is, the extent to which it compresses under load. Its stiffness is many times less than that of concrete, but sufficient for the support of roof loads in some low-height buildings.

Dried, ready-to-use papercrete has a rough surface. This increases its surface area and provides a very strong bond from one block to the next.

Papercrete was also tested for its tensile strength. Fuller noted that a papercrete block was the equivalent of hundred of pages of paper - almost like a catalog. Papercrete has very good shear strength as a block. Lateral load involves sideways force - the wind load on the entire area of an outside wall for example.

Zach Rabon founded Mason Greenstar in Mason, Texas for the purpose of producing and selling a commercially viable papercrete block. His product, Blox Building System, is the only mass-produced commercial papercrete block in the market. He has built several residential structures with it.

The Mason Greenstar block had its genesis in a journey Rabon's father, Kent Rabon, made to Marathon, Texas. The elder Rabon made the acquaintance of Clyde T. Curry, the proprietor of Eve's Garden Organic Bed & Breakfast and Ecology Resource Center.

Curry was an early proponent of papercrete and benefited from the lack of building regulations in the small mountain community of Marathon. Curry built four of the rooms at the bed and breakfast either partially or entirely out of papercrete and is in the process of building two more, in addition to a library and reception area, entirely out of papercrete.
 
Papercrete's ready moldability provides considerable flexibility in the designed shape of structures. Domed ceilings/roofs may be commonly constructed with this material.

Along with Fuller's work at Arizona State University, Curry's establishment has become a resource center for people interested in papercrete, and workshops are intermittently held there.

The Rabons had prior experience as homebuilders and are owners of a ready-mix cement plant in Mason. They  invested in research and testing on their product for several years. However, they consider their product a proprietary formula. They filed for a separate patent even though a patent for papercrete had already been filed in 1928. The block developed by Mason Greenstar is known for its uniform shrinkage (all papercrete blocks go through a lengthy dry-time that involves some shrinkage), giving it a sharper edge.

Fuller has remarked that in tests he has performed on the Rabon block, it has outperformed other formulas.

Papercrete is claimed to have benefit of being a project that involves little cost to start. The materials are claimed to be cheap and widely available. Machinery suitable for small-scale construction is simple to design and construct.

When properly mixed and dried, the papercrete wall can be left exposed to the elements. In its natural state, it is a grey, fibrous-looking wall. For a more conventional look, stucco can be applied directly to it.

A study model home made of papercrete has been built at the Lyle Center for Regenerative Studies. This study model is a sample of homes to be built for a sustainable community in Tijuana by students of California State Polytechnic University, Pomona.

Similar materials
Different earth-paper mixes are promoted under different names. A mix that uses clay as a binder instead of Portland cement is often referred to as "Hybrid Adobe", "Fidobe", or "Padobe".

See also
 Asbestos cement
 Papier mache
 Pykrete
 Fiber cement
 Concrete cloth
 Hypertufa
 Hempcrete

References

External links

 Papercrete Guide Wiki

Concrete
Fibre-reinforced cementitious materials
Engineered wood
Recycled building materials